The discovery of tetracycline engendered an enormous amount of litigation.  In late 1958, the U.S. government charged Pfizer and American Cyanamid with price fixing in connection with tetracycline.  That and other related litigation lasted until 1982.  Often, the series of cases is referred to as the “antibiotics litigation.”

Background

The focal point of the case was the two companies’ settlement of an interference proceeding before the PTO (the U.S. Patent and Trademark Office) over the priority of their respective applications for tetracycline.  Under the settlement, American Cyanamid, which had acquired Heyden Chemicals‘s pending tetracycline application, conceded the priority of Pfizer’s application, withdrew its own application and exchanged cross licenses with Pfizer. According to the indictment of American Cyanamid,  Bristol Myers, Pfizer, and Cyanamid knew that tetracycline represented a threat to the continuation of their dominant positions and unreasonably high profits. To keep that threat in check, the indictment alleges, Cyanamid bought out Heyden's rights to the development and agreed to help Pfizer get the tetracycline patent. In return, charges the Justice Department, Pfizer licensed Cyanamid to produce the drug.  Later, to avoid a court fight that might have nullified the patent, Pfizer and Cyanamid let Bristol-Myers in. 

The Federal Trade Commission found that the cross-license, combined with the fact that Pfizer had withheld information that it knew or should have known was relevant to the patentability of tetracycline, constituted an attempt by Pfizer and American Cyanamid to share in an unlawful monopoly.   Ultimately, the government lost. 

The government also sought to cancel the Pfizer patent on tetracycline, alleging fraud and the concealment of information that would have been relevant to the patent examiner. The government lost the final appeal of that case in 1982.

See also 
 Price fixing cases

References

Medical lawsuits